Enpass  is a cross-platform offline password management app available as a freemium software with subscription plans as also with one time payment licence. 

The app does not store user data on its servers, but locally on their own devices, encrypted. Users can choose to synchronize their data between different devices using their own preferred cloud storage service like Google Drive, Box, Dropbox, OneDrive, iCloud, and WebDAV.

The mobile version is restricted to storing only 25 passwords free of charge, although more functionality is available for a price. The desktop version, however, is unlimited.

In November 2017, developers stopped issuing updates on the BlackBerry platform and in December 2018, with the launch of v6, the company dropped support for Windows 10 Mobile.

Features
The application features client-side encryption, using SQLCipher to encrypt its keychain file locally with a user-defined master password. It features cloud synchronization of the keychain via Google Drive, Box, Dropbox, OneDrive, iCloud and self-hosted WebDAV solutions such as ownCloud and Nextcloud. It features cross browser platform support and form filling for all supported platforms. It features its own integrated software keyboard for form filling on Android devices. It has password generation. Besides pin and master password, it has the functionality of unlocking the app using biometric authentication. In December 2018, Enpass 6 was released with additional features including multiple vaults and the ability to generate time-based one-time passwords for online services.

Platforms 
Enpass support all major operating system platforms which include,

 Windows
 Linux
 Android
 iOS
 Apple Mac

See also
List of password managers
Cryptography
Comparison of password managers
Password manager

References

External links
 

Software that uses Qt
Password managers
Cross-platform software
IOS software
Android (operating system) software
Universal Windows Platform apps
MacOS software